Mirollia is the type genus of Asian bush crickets of the tribe Mirolliini: in the subfamily Phaneropterinae.  Species have been recorded from India, southern China, Indochina and Malesia.

Species
The Orthoptera Species File lists:

 Mirollia abnormis Karny, 1926
 Mirollia acutilobata Wang, Wang & Shi, 2015
 Mirollia aeta Hebard, 1922
 Mirollia amplecta Wang, Wang & Shi, 2015
 Mirollia angusticerca Gorochov & Kang, 2004
 Mirollia beybienkoi Gorochov, 1998
 Mirollia bigemina Ingrisch, 1998
 Mirollia bispina Shi, Chang & Chen, 2005
 Mirollia bispinosa Gorochov & Kang, 2004
 Mirollia caligata Ingrisch, 1998
 Mirollia carinata (Haan, 1843) - type species (as Locusta carinata Haan)
 Mirollia cerciata Hebard, 1922
 Mirollia cincticornis Karny, 1926
 Mirollia composita Bey-Bienko, 1962
 Mirollia compressa Ingrisch & Shishodia, 2000
 Mirollia deficientis Gorochov, 2005
 Mirollia elegantia Gorochov, 2005
 Mirollia fallax Bey-Bienko, 1962
 Mirollia folium Gorochov, 1998
 Mirollia forcipata Ingrisch, 2011
 Mirollia formosana Shiraki, 1930
 Mirollia hainani Gorochov & Kang, 2004
 Mirollia hamata Ingrisch, 1998
 Mirollia hexapinna Ingrisch, 1998
 Mirollia imitata Gorochov, 2008
 Mirollia javae Gorochov, 1998
 Mirollia lanceolata Shi & Wang, 2005
 Mirollia lata Gorochov, 2008
 Mirollia liui Bey-Bienko, 1957
 Mirollia longipinna Ingrisch & Shishodia, 1998
 Mirollia maculosus Wang, Wang & Shi, 2015
 Mirollia malaya Ingrisch, 2011
 Mirollia multidentus Shi, Chang & Chen, 2005
 Mirollia obscuripennis Liu, 2004
 Mirollia paralata Ingrisch, 2011
 Mirollia petiolulata Wang, Wang & Shi, 2015
 Mirollia proxima Gorochov, 1998
 Mirollia quadripunctata Ingrisch, 1990
 Mirollia ranongi Gorochov, 1998
 Mirollia rostellum Gorochov, 2003
 Mirollia rufonotata Mu, He & Wang, 1998
 Mirollia rumidi Ingrisch, 2011
 Mirollia secunda Ingrisch, 2011
 Mirollia spinulosa Ingrisch, 2011
 Mirollia tawai Ingrisch, 2011
 Mirollia terminalis Wang, Wang & Shi, 2015
 Mirollia unispina Wang, Wang & Shi, 2015
 Mirollia yunnani Gorochov & Kang, 2004

References

External links

Tettigoniidae genera
Phaneropterinae